is a railway station in the city of Ueda, Nagano, Japan, jointly operated by the East Japan Railway Company (JR East), the third-sector operator Shinano Railway, and the private railway operator Ueda Electric Railway.

Lines
Ueda Station is served by the following lines.
Hokuriku Shinkansen (formerly named the Nagano Shinkansen), of which it is 189.2 kilometers from Tokyo Station.
Shinano Railway Line, on which it is 40.6 kilometers from Karuizawa Station
Ueda Electric Railway Bessho Line, of which it is the terminus

Station layout

JR East platforms
The JR East station has two elevated opposed side platforms serving two tracks with the station building located underneath. The station has a Midori no Madoguchi staffed ticket office.

Shinano Railway platforms
The Shinano Railway station has one ground-level side platform and one ground-level island platform serving a total of three tracks.

Ueda Electric Railway platform
The Ueda Electric Railway station has one ground-level dead-headed side platform serving a single bi-directional track.

History
The station first opened on 15 August 1888. Local JR East trains services were transferred to the control of the Shinano Railway from 1 October 1997 with the opening of the Nagano Shinkansen. The Ueda Electric Railway station opened on 15 August 1924.

Station numbering was introduced to the Ueda Electric Railway platforms in August 2016 with Ueda being assigned station number BE01.

Passenger statistics
In fiscal 2015, the JR East portion of the station was used by an average of 2,860 passengers daily (boarding passengers only).

Bus routes

Oshiro guchi (お城口) 
Track 1
 Chikuma Bus
 Kakeyu Line
 Aoki Line
 Muroga Line
 Nezu Line
 Kendo Kawanishi Line
 Takeshi Line
 Utsukuhsigahara Yamamotokoya Line
 Expressway Bus Ikebukuro・Shijuku Line for Shinjuku Highway Bus Terminal
 Exprssway Bus Tachikawa Line for Tachikawa Station
 Expressway Bus Kyoto・Osaka Line for Osaka Station via Kyoto Station
 Limited express Bus Ueda・Matsumoto Line for Matsumoto Bus Terminal ※Runs on holidays and all days of August.

Track 2
 Ueda Bus
 Sanada Line
 Shibusawa Line
 Soehi Line
 Hoden Line
 Shinshu Ueda Iryo Center Line
 Shioda Line
 Ario Ueda Line
 Kubobayashi Line

Track 3
 Ueda Bus
 Sugadaira Kogen Line
 "Shinshu no Kamakura Koto meguri Line"（Sightseeing Bus）
 "Sanada Ichizoku no Sato meguri Line"（Sightseeing Bus）
 "Furinkazan to Kawanakajimakassen Line"（Sightseeing Bus）
 Limited express Bus Yubatake Ueda・Kusatsu Onsen Line for Kusatsu Onsen Bus Terminal ※Runs on partly days. 
 JR Bus
 Wadatoge Kita Line
 Expressway Bus Dream Shinshu for Kyoto Station・Osaka Station

Track 4
＊Circular-route Bus in Ueda
 "Aka Bus"
 "Ao Bus"
 Ueda Machinaka Junkai Bus

Onsen guchi 
 Azumino Taxi  – for Hotaka Station

Surrounding area
 Ueda Castle

See also
List of railway stations in Japan

References

External links

JR East Ueda Station
Shinano Railway Ueda Station
Ueda Electric Railway timetable

Railway stations in Japan opened in 1888
Hokuriku Shinkansen
Shinano Railway Line
Railway stations in Nagano Prefecture
Stations of East Japan Railway Company
Ueda Electric Railway
Ueda, Nagano